Rogachi is a rural locality (a khutor) in Atamanovskoye Rural Settlement, Danilovsky District, Volgograd Oblast, Russia. The population was 123 as of 2010. There are 2 streets.

Geography 
Rogachi is located in steppe, on the right bank of the Beryozovka River, 49 km south of Danilovka (the district's administrative centre) by road. Atamanovka is the nearest rural locality.

References 

Rural localities in Danilovsky District, Volgograd Oblast